Ani Khachikyan , is an Armenian actress and presenter. She is known for her roles as Sona on Super Mother and on its sequel Super Mother 2.

Filmography

References

External links 
 

1991 births
Living people
Armenian film actresses
21st-century Armenian actresses
Armenian stage actresses